Leif Jakobsson (born August 24, 1955) is a Swedish social democratic politician who has been a member of the Riksdag since 2002.

References
Leif Jakobsson (S) 

1955 births
Living people
Members of the Riksdag from the Social Democrats
Members of the Riksdag 2002–2006
Members of the Riksdag 2006–2010
Members of the Riksdag 2010–2014
Members of the Riksdag 2014–2018
Place of birth missing (living people)
21st-century Swedish politicians